Lake Tréné is a small lake located in the Mayo-Kebbi Ouest Region of south-western Chad. It is about 6km by 2km and is fed by the Mayo Kébbi river that leaves near Léré and proceeds through the larger Lake Léré.

References

Tréné
Lakes of Africa